Iraponia is a monotypic genus of Asian araneomorph spiders in the family Caponiidae, containing the single species, Iraponia scutata. It was first described by Y. Kranz-Baltensperger, Norman I. Platnick & N. Dupérré in 2009, and has only been found in Iran.

References

Caponiidae
Monotypic Araneomorphae genera
Spiders of Asia